Kitticarrara Glacier is a short, steep glacier  south of Howard Glacier in the Kukri Hills, flowing east-southeast into Ferrar Glacier, in Victoria Land, Antarctica. It was named by the Western Journey Party, led by Thomas Griffith Taylor, of the British Antarctic Expedition, 1910–13. The name was suggested by Frank Debenham after Kitticarrara, a sheep station in New South Wales.

References

Glaciers of Victoria Land
Scott Coast